The 1943 All-Ireland Senior Football Championship was the 57th staging of Ireland's premier Gaelic football knock-out competition.

In the Leinster Quarter-Final Louth ended Dublin's year as All-Ireland Champions.

Roscommon were the winners.
Kilkenny took part in the Leinster championship for the 1st time since 1931.

Results

Connacht Senior Football Championship

Leinster Senior Football Championship

Munster Senior Football Championship

Ulster Senior Football Championship

All-Ireland Senior Football Championship

Championship statistics

Miscellaneous

 The Wexford vs Kilkenny game was Kilkenny's first game since 1931 as they rejoin the Leinster football championship.
 Louth win the Leinster championship for the first time since 1912.
 Cork won their first Munster title since 1928.
 Roscommon won the All-Ireland title for the first time ever becoming the third county from Connacht after Roscommon in 1925 and then Mayo in 1936 to do so; Roscommon also won a first Connacht title since 1914. 
 There were a number of first-time championship meetings: The complete All-Ireland Series from the semi-finals of Roscommon vs Louth, Cavan vs Cork and the final between Roscommon and Cavan were all the first championship meetings of the teams.
 The All-Ireland final ended in a draw and went to a replay for the first time since 1938.

References